Mark Carlson (born June 6, 1963) is a former American football offensive tackle in the National Football League for the Washington Redskins.  He played college football at Southern Connecticut State University. He has three daughters and a wife and they are all living now in North Carolina. He coaches offensive line for Cuthbertson High School in Waxhaw, NC.

References

1963 births
Living people
Players of American football from New Haven, Connecticut
American football offensive tackles
Southern Connecticut State Owls football players
Boston University Terriers football players
Washington Redskins players